Rodolfo Dorador Pérez Gavilán (born 13 February 1969) is a Mexican politician affiliated with the PAN. He currently serves as Deputy of the LXII Legislature of the Mexican Congress representing Durango. He also served as Deputy during the LVIII Legislature and as Senator during the LX and LXI Legislatures.

References

1969 births
Living people
Politicians from Durango
People from Durango City
Members of the Senate of the Republic (Mexico)
Members of the Chamber of Deputies (Mexico)
National Action Party (Mexico) politicians
21st-century Mexican politicians
Universidad Juárez del Estado de Durango alumni
Panamerican University alumni